was a Japanese painter.

He moved to Edo and studied painting with Sakai Hōitsu (1761-1828).

He created a series of paintings that are closely related to a set by Hoitsu depicting court festivals (gosekku), that were adapted from Chinese practices and celebrated in Japan since the Nara period.

References

1801 births
1866 deaths
19th-century Japanese painters